Talkheh Zar-e Olya (also Romanized as Talkheh Zār-e ‘Olyā) is a village in Bahmayi-ye Sarhadi-ye Sharqi Rural District, Dishmok District, Kohgiluyeh County, Kohgiluyeh and Boyer-Ahmad Province, Iran. At the 2006 census, its population was 62, in 13 families.

References 

Populated places in Kohgiluyeh County